The orange-fronted yellow finch (Sicalis columbiana) is a species of South American bird in the family Thraupidae. It has a highly disjunct distribution with S. c. columbiana found in Colombia and Venezuela, S. c. goeldii along the Amazon River in Brazil, and S. c. goeldii in east-central Brazil. It is found in semi-open areas, typically near water and sometimes near humans. The male closely resembles the saffron finch, but it is smaller, has a more contrasting orange front, and dusky lores. The female is overall olive-gray with whitish underparts, and yellow to the wings and tail.

References

orange-fronted yellow finch
Birds of Colombia
Birds of Venezuela
Birds of the Amazon Basin
Birds of Brazil
orange-fronted yellow finch
Taxonomy articles created by Polbot